Chrysoblastella is an genus of haplolepideous mosses (Dicranidae) in the monotypic family Chrysoblastellaceae. The genus was previously placed in the family Ditrichaceae.

References

Moss genera
Bryopsida